General Sir Francis John Davies,  (3 July 1864 – 18 March 1948) was a senior British Army officer who commanded the 8th Division during the First World War.

Early life and education
Davies was born in London, the son of Lt.-Gen. Henry Fanshawe Davies and his wife, Ellen Christine Alexandra Hankey. His grandfather was General Francis John Davies (died 1878) and his great-grandfather was Admiral of the Fleet Sir Thomas Byam Martin. The family seat was Elmley Castle, Pershore, Worcestershire. His younger brother was Maj-Gen. Henry Rodolph Davies (1865–1950). He was educated at Eton College.

Military career
Davies was commissioned into the Worcestershire Militia in 1881. He transferred to the Grenadier Guards — his father's and his grandfather's former regiment – as a lieutenant on 14 May 1884, becoming Adjutant to the 2 Bn Grenadier Guards in 1893. Promoted to captain on 28 October 1895, he was in 1897 posted to South Africa where he became Deputy Assistant Adjutant General for the Cape of Good Hope, and received a further promotion to major on 12 July 1899. After the outbreak of the Second Boer War in October 1899, he served as Deputy Assistant Adjutant General responsible for Intelligence at Army Headquarters in South Africa. He was appointed acting Commissioner of Police for Johannesburg in 1900, and received a brevet promotion to lieutenant-colonel dated 29 November 1900.

He returned to the United Kingdom in 1902 and was temporarily employed in the Intelligence Department until he became Deputy Assistant Quartermaster General at the War Office on 7 September 1902. Two years later he was appointed Assistant Director of Military Operations in 1904. He was the British delegate to the International Conference on Wireless Telegraphy in Berlin in 1906 and then Assistant Quartermaster General for Western Command in 1907.

He was made General Officer Commanding 1 (Guards) Brigade in 1909 and then Director of Staff Duties at the War Office in 1913.

He served in the First World War, becoming General Officer Commanding 8th Division on the Western Front in 1914 (in which capacity he led the division at the Battle of Neuve Chapelle and the Battle of Aubers Ridge) and Military Secretary in 1916.

After the war he was appointed General Officer Commanding-in-Chief for Scottish Command in 1919; he retired in 1923.

Freemasonry
From 1919 until his death in 1948 he served as Provincial Grand Master of Freemasons in Worcestershire. During his time in office, 50 new masonic lodges were dedicated and he personally participated at 41 of these. From 1935 to 1947 he also held the position of Deputy Grand Master of the United Grand Lodge of England, paying official visits to numerous Provinces in this country and to many Grand Lodges overseas.

References

|-
 

|-
 

1864 births
1948 deaths
British Army generals
People educated at Eton College
British Army generals of World War I
Knights Commander of the Order of the Bath
Knights Commander of the Order of St Michael and St George
Knights Commander of the Royal Victorian Order
Grenadier Guards officers
British Army personnel of the Second Boer War
Admirals and Generals from Worcestershire
Military personnel from London
Freemasons of the United Grand Lodge of England